Dominika Švarc Pipan (born 9 July 1978) is a Slovenian politician and lawyer. She serves as the minister of justice of Slovenia since 2022.

Early life and career 
Dominika Švarc Pipan was born on 9 July 1978 in Slovenj Gradec, Slovenia. She grew up in Dravograd. She attended the Ravne na Koroškem Gymnasium and graduated in 1997.  She then enrolled at the University of Ljubljana and studied Law. She graduated from the institution in 2003. She continued her education at the London School of Economics where she majored in Political Science and in 2011 received her PhD in political science. She was a volleyball coach in her youth.

During the 2018 Slovenian parliamentary election, she contested on the platform of the Social Democrats in the district of Radlje ob Dravi. She received 1,794 votes (16.74%) of the vote and ranked second in the district. Between September 2018 and March 2020, she served as state secretary at the Ministry of Justice of the Republic of Slovenia. On 10 October 2020, she was elected the Vice President of Social Democrats (Slovenia). During 2022 Slovenian parliamentary election, she ran for office and received 759 (6.08%) votes and was not elected to office.

On 1 June 2022, she was appointed as the minister of justice in the 15th Government of Slovenia under the leadership of Prime Minister Robert Golob.

Personal life 
In 2017, she married her husband Matjaž Pipan and has one child.

References 

1978 births
Living people
21st-century Slovenian lawyers
Female justice ministers
Justice ministers of Slovenia
People from Slovenj Gradec
Slovenian women lawyers
Slovenian politicians
Social Democrats (Slovenia) politicians
University of Ljubljana alumni
Women government ministers of Slovenia